Line 2 of the Wuxi Metro is a rapid transit line linking east and west Wuxi. It opened on 28 December 2014. Two infill stations, Yingyuehu Park station and Yingbin Square station, opened on 28 April 2015. Anzhen station is not opened.

The line is 26.3 km long with 22 stations.

Opening timeline

Stations (west to east)

References

2
2014 establishments in China
Railway lines opened in 2014